Gapis (also Romanized as Gāpīs) is a village in Mokriyan-e Gharbi Rural District, in the Central District of Mahabad County, West Azerbaijan Province, Iran. At the 2006 census, its population was 542, in 104 families.

References 

Populated places in Mahabad County